The National Entrance Screening Test (popularly known as NEST) is an annual college entrance examination in India, conducted for admission into the National Institute of Science Education and Research, Bhubaneswar (NISER) and the Center for Excellence in Basic Sciences (UM-DAE CEBS), Mumbai. These two institutes use NEST as a sole criterion for admission to their undergraduate programs. Also, the Integrated Science Education & Research Centre (ISERC) of Visva-Bharati University has been using the merit list of NEST for admission into its undergraduate program.

As of 2018, obtaining a seat in NISER has become highly competitive. From a total of roughly 80,000 applicants nationwide, only 0.5% qualify for admission. As of 2018, the total intake of NISER and UM-DAE CBS is 200+2 students and 45+2 students respectively (where two seats in each college are reserved for students belonging to the state of Jammu and Kashmir). 
NEST is conducted in both English as well as Hindi language.

Pattern of the test 
The NEST question paper has five sections. The first section, which is compulsory for all candidates, includes general questions. The next four sections includes questions on (1) Biology, (2) Chemistry, (3) Mathematics and (4) Physics. Candidates can attempt  all the four sections out of which the best three will be taken to calculate the final marks and percentile. All sections carry equal marks (17 questions as of 2022) and has sectional cutoff. The questions are aimed at testing the Conceptual understanding and analytic ability of the candidates. The questions are of objective type with four answers given for each question, for 12 questions there may only be one relatively correct answer for each which fetches 2.5 marks. Wrong answers are awarded -1 marks. Remaining 5 questions have multiple correct options for partially correct or incorrect answers students are awarded 0 marks and for completely correct 4 marks.

Seats and intake
The number of students taking the examination has been increasing since it was first conducted in 2007. In 2020 200+2 seats were for NISER and 45+2 seats for UM-DAE CBS.  About 90,000 students appeared in the exam. The exam was conducted in two sittings. 9hrs to 12:30hrs and 14hrs to 17:30hrs.

The availability of seats in recent years is as given in table below:

See also

 National Institute of Science Education and Research, Bhubaneswar

References

External links
 National Entrance Screening Test official website

Standardised tests in India
Year of establishment missing